Stanley Dickens (born 7 May 1952) is a Swedish racing driver who won the Le Mans 24 hours in 1989 driving a Sauber C9-Mercedes. He was born in Färila.

Notable results
 1000km of Suzuka: 1st,1989
 500km of Fuji: 1st,1988, 2nd,1986, 3e,1990
 500km of Mid-Ohio: 3e,1989
 Interserie Nürburgring: 1st (class win),1984
 200 mile of Norisring: 3e:1987, 
 1000km of Spa Franchorchamps: 2nd, (class) 1985,

Complete 24 Hours of Le Mans results

References

External links
http://stanleydickens.com/

1952 births
Swedish racing drivers
European Formula Two Championship drivers
24 Hours of Le Mans drivers
24 Hours of Le Mans winning drivers
Living people
World Sportscar Championship drivers

Mercedes-AMG Motorsport drivers
Team Joest drivers
Sauber Motorsport drivers